The 2018 LBA Finals was the championship series of the 2017–18 regular season, of the Lega Basket Serie A (LBA), known for sponsorship reasons as the Serie A PosteMobile, the highest professional basketball league in Italy, and the conclusion of the season's playoffs. The second placed EA7 Emporio Armani Milano possessing home advantage (with the first two, the fifth and the seventh games at the Mediolanum Forum) and the 5th placed Dolomiti Energia Trento contested for the title in a best-of-7 showdown, from June 5 to June 15, 2018.
These were the second Finals for Trento and the 18th for Milano.

EA7 Emporio Armani Milano won their 28th title by beating Dolomiti Energia Trento in game 6 of the finals.

Andrew Goudelock of the EA7 Emporio Armani Milano was named MVP in the league's Finals series of the playoffs.

Road to the finals

Italian Basketball Supercup

Regular season series

Series

Game 1

Game 2

Game 3

Game 4

Game 5

Game 6
EA7 Emporio Armani Milano returned to the Italian throne on Friday night. In Game 6 of the Italian League playoff finals, Milan dominated to defeated Dolomiti Energia Trento 71-96 to claim the series 4-2 and become the Italian champion for the 28th time in club history. This is also third league title in the last five years for Milan which took control of this game from the start. Vladimir Micov and Mindaugas Kuzminskas hit triple and Artūras Gudaitis had a pair of dunks in a 1-10 first-quarter run that helped Milan to a 20-25 lead after 10 minutes, before a pair of triples from Dairis Bertāns, one from Andrew Goudelock, and baskets from Gudaitis and Curtis Jerrells opened 23-42 margin early in the second quarter. The visitors went into halftime with a 15-point lead, and never relinquished it. Trento got within 50-57 midway through the third, but Milan entered the final period with a 56-66 lead, before Goudelock, Bertāns and Kuzminskas each hit once from downtown in the first 2 minutes of the fourth, restoring a 15-point lead and Milan cruised the rest of the way. Milan had a balanced attack with six scorers in double figures. Goudelock finished with 21 points, Kuzminskas and Bertāns netted 15 apiece, and Gudaitis collected 14 points and 9 rebounds. Dominique Sutton scored 15 for Trento, and Shavon Shields and Toto Forray each scored 14 in the losing effort.

Rosters

EA7 Emporio Armani Milano

Dolomiti Energia Trento

References

External links
Official website

Finals
Finals
Lega Basket Serie A Finals